Lituya may refer to:

Lituya Bay, in Alaska, the United States
Lituya Mountain, peak in the Fairweather Range of Alaska, the United States
Lituya Glacier, tidewater glacier in Alaska, the United States 
MV Lituya, shuttle ferry for the Alaska Marine Highway System